Elizabeth Glaser (born Elizabeth Meyer;  – ) was an American AIDS activist and child advocate married to actor and director Paul Michael Glaser. She contracted HIV very early in the modern AIDS epidemic after receiving an HIV-contaminated blood transfusion in 1981 while giving birth. Like other HIV-infected mothers, Glaser unknowingly passed the virus to her infant daughter, Ariel, who died in 1988.

Life
Elizabeth Glaser was born November 11, 1947 in New York City and raised in Hewlett Harbor, New York.
She became the exhibit director of the Los Angeles Children's Museum.

Glaser graduated in 1965 from what is now the Lawrence Woodmere Academy.

Illness
In 1981, very early in the modern AIDS epidemic Elizabeth Glaser contracted HIV after receiving an HIV-contaminated blood transfusion while giving birth. Like other HIV-infected mothers, Glaser unknowingly passed the virus to her infant daughter, Ariel, through breastfeeding. Ariel  developed advanced AIDS at a time when the medical community knew very little about the disease, and there were no available treatment options; she suffered some of the same ostracism from her school as Ryan White experienced.

Early in 1987, the U.S. Food and Drug Administration finally approved AZT as an effective drug to extend the lives of AIDS patients, but the approval only extended to adults. With their daughter's condition rapidly deteriorating, the Glasers fought to have her treated with AZT intravenously. However, the treatment came too late, and the child succumbed to the disease late in the summer of 1988.

In the same year 1988, she created the Pediatric AIDS Foundation, to raise funds for pediatric HIV/AIDS research.

Glaser entered the national spotlight as a speaker at the 1992 Democratic National Convention, where she criticized the federal government's under-funding of AIDS research and its lack of initiative in tackling the AIDS crisis. This speech is listed as #79 in American Rhetoric's Top 100 Speeches of the 20th Century listed by rank. 

In 1994, Elizabeth Glaser died at the age of 47, from complications of acquired immune deficiency syndrome, at her home in Santa Monica on December 3, 1994. Her son Jake born in 1984, contracted HIV from his mother in utero, but has remained relatively healthy due to a mutation of the CCR5 gene that protects his white blood cells. He later became a public speaker on behalf of AIDS patients.

Legacy
The Elizabeth Glaser Pediatric AIDS Foundation is a major force in funding the study of pediatric HIV problems and tackling juvenile AIDS, both domestically and globally. Glaser´s book In the Absence of Angels (1991), written with journalist Laura Palmer, was described as "a handbook of how the connected make waves in America".

The AIDS Memorial Quilt contains five panels with Elizabeth Glaser and her daughter Ariel Glaser's name on each of them, three panels with Elizabeth Glaser's name alone on each of them, and two panels with Ariel Glaser's name alone on each of them.

See also
Martin Gaffney – Gaffney contracted the HIV virus from his wife Mutsuko Gaffney who, like Elizabeth Glaser, was infected via a tainted blood transfusion and had two children contract HIV from their mother in utero.

References

External links
 Elizabeth Glaser Pediatric AIDS Foundation
 Elizabeth's Story

1947 births
1994 deaths
HIV/AIDS activists
American health activists
University of Wisconsin–Madison alumni
Boston University School of Education alumni
People from Santa Monica, California
People from The Five Towns, New York
People from New York City
AIDS-related deaths in California
Burials at Sharon Memorial Park, Massachusetts
Lawrence Woodmere Academy alumni